Sylvester Lopez (born Silvester Lopez on October 26, 1987) is a Filipino professional boxer who is the current WBC Silver Super Flyweight Champion and is also the former WBC International Super Flyweight Champion.

Currently, he is rated #1 in the World Boxing Council in the super flyweight division and is scheduled to fight Yota Sato for his first title defense.

Born in Kabasalan, Zamboanga Sibugay, he currently resides in Sucat, Parañaque and is training under the Elorde Boxing Stable.

Personal life 
Silver was born on October 26, 1987 in Kabasalan, Zamboanga Sibugay. He is the son of Roseller Lopez and Maura Berador Lopez. He is the seventh among eight siblings: Roseller Jr., Christopher, Percival, Phillip, Jennifer, Rosemarie, and Lorjem. He came from a family of boxers, his father being a former professional boxer and three of this brothers (Christopher, Percival, Phillip) former amateur boxers. Among them, he is the only one active in the boxing field.

Amateur career 
Silver started as an amateur boxer at an early age of 13. He juggled his boxing career and high school education to be able to help his family financially. He participated in several inter-school and inter-barangay boxing competitions.

Professional career 
At the age of 17, former boxer Celso Danggod brought him to Manila to join Dante Almario's boxing stable. He was eventually led to Gabriel "Bebot" Elorde's boxing stable and continued his boxing career under his stable.

Lopez made his professional debut on October 13, 2006 against fellow Filipino Joey Balmes. The bout took place in Trece Martires, Cavite and he won via a unanimous decision.

Three years later, he won the vacant WBC International Super Flyweight title on April 5, 2009, by beating Korean Jong-Nam Park via a technical knockout in the 8th round. Park went down three times in the opening round and was floored once in the 8th round, which prompted the stoppage. The fight took place in the Ynares Sports Arena in Pasig.

Lopez successfully defended his belt against Japanese Katsumi Makiyama and Thai Wandee Singwangcha on November 28, 2009 and July 31, 2010 respectively. Both bouts happened in Pasig.

On October 2, 2010, he lost via 5th round technical decision over Juan José Montes for Montes' WBC Youth World Super Flyweight belt. This fight also was a WBC Super Flyweight title eliminator, where the winner will challenge the world title then held by Tomás Rojas. A rematch was negotiated in the WBC convention but was not granted.

On September 24, 2011, he stopped Mexican Oscar "Ceviche" Ibarra to successfully capture the WBC Silver Super Flyweight belt at the Plaza De Toros in Querétaro, Mexico. This fight made him the mandatory challenger for the WBC Super Flyweight title which had been succeeded by Suriyan Sor Rungvisai at that time.

While Lopez had been the WBC's top contender in his division for about two years (the number one rated contender for over a year since January 2011), the title has been moved twice. Lopez's promoter Gabriel Elorde Jr. stated that Lopez should have been given the world title shot against any of those three champions and insisted that "Now it's our turn. Lopez is next. No more delays." Lopez watched the fight where Rungvisai lost the title to Yota Sato at ringside in Tokyo, Japan with Elorde Jr. in March 2012. Elorde Jr. immediately contacted the WBC president José Sulaimán and reaffirmed the decision of the WBC Convention in December 2011 where Lopez was approved as a mandatory challenger for the title mentioning that he hopes that Sato would face Lopez in his first defense after three months. Although Rungvisai's promoter has held a two-fight option on Sato, Lopez's long-awaited first world title shot was decided to take place against Sato at the Yokohama Cultural Gymnasium on July 8, 2012.

References

External links 
 Boxrec Professional Boxing Record 

1987 births
Living people
Super-flyweight boxers
World Boxing Council champions
People from Zamboanga Sibugay
Filipino male boxers